National Nanotechnology Center (NANOTEC) is one of Thailand's National Research Centers, directed by National Science and Technology Development Agency (NSTDA), Ministry of Higher Education, Science, Research and Innovation.

See also 
 Nanotechnology
 National Science and Technology Development Agency (NSTDA)

External links 
 

Research institutes in Thailand
Nanotechnology institutions
National Science and Technology Development Agency